Michelle or Michele Taylor may refer to:

Michele Martin Taylor (born 1946), American fine art painter
Michele Anne Taylor (1965–2001), American victim of presumed murder, married name Michele Anne Harris
Michèle Taylor, American ambassador to UN Human Rights Council since 2022
Michelle Taylor, birth name of American social worker and writer Feminista Jones
Michelle Taylor, convicted and then acquitted of murdering Alison Shaughnessy in London in 1991